is a 1964 Japanese television series. It is the 2nd NHK taiga drama.

Story
Akō Rōshi  deals with the Edo period. Based on Jirō Osaragi's novels "Hana no Shōgai".

It depicts the stories of the Forty-seven rōnin.

Cast
 Kazuo Hasegawa as Ōishi Kuranosuke
 Shinsuke Ashida as Kobayashi Heihichi
 Chikage Awashima as Osen
 Takahiro Tamura as Takada Gunbei
 Masakazu Tamura
 Jukichi Uno
 Katsuo Nakamura as Ōishi Chikara
 Takashi Shimura as Onodera Junai
 Yoichi Hayashi as Hotta Yayato
 Kyoko Kishida as Aguri
 Kei Taguchi as kayano Wasuke
 Kazuo Funaki as yato Emohichi
 Takuya Fujioka as Oishi Sezaemon
 Ichiro Sugai as Ono Kurobei
 Rokkō Toura as Takebayashi Takashige
 Masato Yamanouchi as Uesugi Tsunanori
 Morita Kan'ya XIV as Tokugawa Tsunayoshi
 Kyoko Kishida as Aguri
 Jun Tazaki
 Junzaburō Ban as Maruoka Bokuan
 Akira Kume as Wakizaka Awaji no Kami
 Fubuki Koshiji as Ukiyo daou
 Kō Nishimura as Aizawa Shinbei
 Ryūtarō Ōtomo as Horiuchi
 Kanjūrō Arashi as Hosokawa Echu no Kami
 Osamu Takizawa as Kira Kōzuke no suke
 Isuzu Yamada as Ōishi Riku

References

External links

1964 Japanese television series debuts
1964 Japanese television series endings
Taiga drama
1960s drama television series
Jidaigeki television series
Television shows based on Japanese novels
Television series set in the 17th century